Haunted Highway (originally called Paranormal Highway) is an American paranormal investigation reality television series produced by BASE Productions. It began airing on the Syfy network on July 3, 2012.

The series features two teams of investigators; Jack Osbourne, investigator Dana Workman, and Fact or Faked: Paranormal Files investigators Jael de Pardo and Devin Marble.

On the 5th episode of the series, Osbourne announced that he was diagnosed with multiple sclerosis (MS) and temporarily stepped down as host of the series.

On April 22, 2013, Syfy renewed the show for a six-episode second season which premiered on November 27, 2013.

Format
The two teams drive across America's highways and back roads, investigating cases of various alleged cryptid sightings. During the intro, Osbourne states that he has had an interest in the paranormal since he was a child and that the show takes a unique investigative approach whereby the teams film their own video footage and do not rely on camera crews.

Opening Introductions:

Premiere episode intro:

Main episode intro:

Cast
 Jack Osbourne - Team Leader
 Dana Workman - Researcher
 Jael de Pardo - Investigator
 Devin Marble - Investigator

Episodes

Season 1

Season 2

References

External links

Syfy original programming
Paranormal reality television series
2010s American reality television series
2012 American television series debuts
2013 American television series endings